The  is a national expressway in the Chūgoku region of Japan. It is owned and operated by West Nippon Expressway Company.

Naming
The expressway is officially referred to as the Chūgoku-Ōdan Expressway Onomichi Matsue Route. The Chūgoku-Ōdan Expressway Onomichi Matsue Route is the official designation for the Sanyō Expressway between Onomichi Interchange and Hiroshima Junction, the Onomichi Expressway between Onomichi Junction and Miyoshi-Higashi Junction, and the Matsue Expressway between Miyoshi-Higashi Junction and Matsue Interchange (concurrent with the Chūgoku-Ōdan Expressway Onomichi Matsue Route).

Overview
The first section of the expressway was opened in 2010. The final section of the expressway (18.4 km between Kisa Interchange and Sera Interchange) was opened on March 22, 2015. The route originates from its junction with the Sanyō Expressway and extends northward. At its northern terminus it connects to the Chūgoku Expressway. The entire route is toll-free with the exception of the short (0.9 km) section between Onomichi Junction and Onomichi Toll Gate.

The route is 2 lanes for its entire length, with some overtaking areas. The speed limit is 70 km/h.

List of interchanges and features

 IC - interchange, SIC - smart interchange, JCT - junction, SA - service area, PA - parking area, BS - bus stop, TN - tunnel, BR - bridge

External links
 West Nippon Expressway Company

Expressways in Japan
Roads in Hiroshima Prefecture